Livingston was a professional basketball team that was based in Livingston, Scotland. The team was founded in 1977, under the name Edinburgh, by steel magnate David Murray, and was backed by a sponsorship from his company, Murray International Metals. Using the name Murray International or MIM Livingston, they went on to be one of the most successful clubs in Scottish basketball history, playing first in Edinburgh, and then later moving to Livingston.

History
During the height of its success, Livingston were Scottish National League Champions seven times between 1979 and 1987. The club were founder members of the British Basketball League, a professional league established in 1987 by leading clubs from England and Scotland. Playing out of the newly built 3,000-seat Forum Arena, Livingston were successful in their inaugural season and with an 81–72 victory over regular season champions Portsmouth, were winners of the first Carlsberg League Championship Final.

In 1988 Murray acquired Rangers Football Club and inherited plans to form a 'sporting club' as the previous owner had bought Carlsberg League club Kingston for £100,000 and moved them to Glasgow. The Glasgow Rangers basketball team made their first appearance alongside Livingston in the 1988–89 season, becoming the league's second Scottish club. Rangers dominated the campaign, pipping Livingston to the regular season title and then beating them in the final of the Championship Play-offs, winning 89–86. Livingston also finished as runners-up in the NatWest League Trophy, losing 89–81 to Bracknell in the Final.

Despite the success of his two basketball teams, Murray was rumoured to have had a fall out with the basketball authorities in 1989 over a proposal to have both teams playing at The Forum Arena on alternate weekends, meaning a home game would be staged every week. The move was blocked and so Murray withdrew his financial support. The Rangers team was sold and moved back to Kingston-upon-Thames in 1989, whilst the Livingston club briefly returned to the Scottish League before becoming the Livingston Bulls.

Notable players

 Bobby Archibald
 Alton Byrd
 Alan Cunningham
 Vic Fleming

Record in European competition

See also
 Midlothian Bulls
 British Basketball League

References

Defunct basketball teams in the United Kingdom
Sport in West Lothian
Defunct sports teams in Scotland
Basketball teams in Scotland
Sports teams in Edinburgh
Livingston, West Lothian
Former British Basketball League teams
Basketball teams established in 1977
Basketball teams disestablished in 1991
1977 establishments in Scotland
1991 disestablishments in Scotland